Fosdick can stand for:

Places
 Fosdick-Masten Park High School, an historic public high school building in Buffalo, New York
 Fosdick Mountains, a mountain range in Antarctica

People
 Harry Castlemon (1842–1915), nom de plume of American author Charles Austin Fosdick
 Dorothy Fosdick (1913–1997), American foreign policy expert
 Harry Emerson Fosdick (1878–1969), American clergyman
 Nicoll Fosdick (1785–1868), American merchant and politician
 W. W. Fosdick (1825–1862), American lawyer, poet, writer and song lyricist

Other uses
 Fearless Fosdick, a comic strip hero from Al Capp's Li'l Abner